The 2016 Fareham Borough Council election took place on 5 May 2016 to elect members of Fareham Borough Council in England. This was on the same day as other local elections.

Half of the seats were up for re-election, with each councillor elected for a term of 4 years (except in the Fareham East ward). The last time these seats were contested was in 2012.

As well as wards in the town of Fareham, candidates were being elected in Hill Head, Locks Heath, Park Gate, Portchester, Titchfield, Sarisbury, Stubbington and Warsash.

In the Fareham East ward, voters elected 2 candidates. The candidate in first place was elected for a 4-year term and the candidate in second place was elected for a 2-year term.

After the election, the composition of the council was:
Conservative 24
Liberal Democrat 4
UKIP 2
Independent 1

Election results

The Conservatives remained in overall control, winning 12 seats. The Liberal Democrats won 3 seats, and UKIP won 1 seat.

In Fareham West, incumbent councillor Nick Gregory stood down after six years on the council. He was first elected in a 2010 by-election as a Liberal Democrat, before defecting to the Conservatives and holding the seat in the 2012 elections. He then left the Conservative grouping to sit as an independent, before defecting to UKIP and then reverting to being an independent. The Lib Dem opposition leader, Paul Whittle stated that he had "changed colours more times than a set of traffic lights".

Ward results
Note that all percentage change are in relation to the 2012 election when these seats were last contested

Fareham East

Fareham North

Fareham North West

Fareham South

Fareham West

Hill Head

Locks Heath

Park Gate

Portchester East

Portchester West

Sarisbury

Stubbington

Titchfield

Titchfield Common

Warsash

References

2016 English local elections
2016
2010s in Hampshire